Dicle is a Kurdish and Turkish surname and feminine given name. Its meaning in the Turkish language is "Tigris".

Given name
 Dicle Nur Babat (born 1992), Turkish volleyball player

Surname

 Ahmet Dicle (born 1980), Kurdish journalist and television presenter
 Hacer Dicle (1902–1966), Turkish politician
 Hamdi Dicle (born 1932), Turkish painter and art educator
 Hatip Dicle (born 1954), Kurdish politician

Turkish-language surnames
Turkish feminine given names